Amod K. Kanth is a social activist, and former policeman who is best known as the founder of the NGO Prayas, being a children rights advocate and chairperson of the Delhi Commission for Protection of Child Rights (DCPCR).
He is also linked with the Uphaar Cinema fire and the 1984 Sikh Riots.

Schooling and education 

Kanth has a BA in history from M.S.College, Motihari and a Master of Arts in Law from the University of Delhi

1974 to 1988 - Police Career 

Kanth has held multiple important posts including those of the DGP of Goa and Arunachal Pradesh. he has received President's Police Medals and Gallantry Award for saving thousands of victims of riots in Delhi. He was involved in some important investigations including the assassination of Rajiv Gandhi and Lalit Maken. he has also undertaken several investigations into narcotics and child abuse

1984 Sikh Riots 

Although not directly accused there is a case pending in court requesting the stripping away of his medal which was awarded for maintaining law and order during the 1984 anti-Sikh riots. The case specifically is that of the death of Narinder Singh while he was in Police Custody. The court has rejected this plea.

1997 Uphaar Tragedy 

There is a case pending in the Delhi High Court investigating the death by asphyxiation of 59 people in the Uphaar Cinema fire. In this case the court has charged Kanth under section 304A (causing death by rash and negligent act), 337 (causing hurt by an act which endangers human life) and 338 (causing grievous hurt by an act which endangers human life) of IPC (Indian Penal Code). He is also being charged under the Cinamtography Act.

1988 to 2019 - Prayas and other causes 

In 1988 Kanth formed Prayas, an organisation that deals with the delivery of welfare, education and protection of children, youths, women and the weaker sections of society through individual, corporate, NGO and governmental development activities. From 2007 to 2011 he was the chairman of the Delhi Commission for Protection of Child Rights (DCPCR), and in this role he has voiced his concerns and support for the Right to Education Act.

He has contributed to various policy discussions of the Indian Government in these fields. He has also participated in youth related initiatives of the UN, UNICEF and US government and in many children and youth related initiatives in India, Nepal and Bangladesh.

Opposing the overturning of Section 377 and LGBT rights 
Under his leadership DCPCR was the only government organisation which appealed against the scrapping of Section 377 of the Indian Penal Code In his arguments the attorney Amit Anand Tiwari, advocate for DCPCR, said “We studied various materials from medical journals and found studies that show that children of LGBT parents were more prone to social stigmatisation. In decriminalising homosexuality, the High Court did not devise any protection as far adoption laws were concerned – whether gay and lesbian couples can adopt children, whether they have right to adopt. These issues were not addressed by the High Court order”. Kanth said, “Under the United Nation Convention on Rights of Children and under Indian laws, every child has a right to a family. And family is clearly defined as mother and father. Therefore, the High Court order was a direct denial of the child’s right to a family and right to parenthood”. Interestingly, though these were DCPCR’s reasons for intervening in the case, the issue of protection of child rights finds no mention in the Commission’s final submissions made to the Supreme Court.

2008 to present - Politics 

Kanth contested the Sangam Vihar Constituency of Delhi on a Congress ticket in November 2008.

Kanth has been honored by Sandeep Marwah with the life membership of International Film And Television Club of Asian Academy of Film & Television at Noida Film City.

References 

Year of birth missing (living people)
Living people
Social workers
Delhi politicians
Indian National Congress politicians from Jharkhand
People from Ranchi
Delhi University alumni
Social workers from Uttarakhand